Nilgiri vandeleuria (Vandeleuria nilagirica), also known as the Nilgiri long-tailed tree mouse and the Indian long-tailed tree mouse, is a species of rodent in the family Muridae. There has been some dispute as to whether this specimen is actually a subspecies of the Asiatic long-tailed climbing mouse but current opinion seems to suggest that it is indeed a separate species. It is found in India.

References

External links

An image of Nilgiri Vandeleuria

Rats of Asia
Vandeleuria
Endemic fauna of the Western Ghats
Rodents of India
Mammals described in 1867